The Rwanda women's national football team represents Rwanda in women's association football and is controlled by the Rwandese Association Football Federation. It had to date been scheduled to compete in one major tournament, the inaugural Women's Challenge Cup held in Zanzibar in October 2007, but the event was ultimately canceled. It has finally debuted in February 2014 against Kenya. The team is nicknamed The She-Amavubi (Kinyarwanda for The She-Wasps).

History

Background
The development of women's football in Africa faces several challenges, including limited access to education, poverty amongst women in the wider society, and fundamental inequality present in that society that occasionally allows for female-specific human rights abuses. At the same time, if talented women footballers do emerge, many choose to go abroad to maximize playing opportunities. A lack of funding impedes regional development of women's football as most of the funding for the women's national team comes from FIFA, not the national football association.

Inside Rwanda, the first women's football programme was developed in 2000. "Kicking for Reconciliation" was created during the late 2000s, and involved over 100 young players in an attempt at "bringing healing to a nation that saw the worst genocide since World War II" through sport. The programme was open to both Tutsis and Hutus. By 2008, this included a schools and university competition. Women's football was supported by a single dedicated national federation staffer by 2006. Women's sport, including football, received little press coverage in the Rwandan media. A women's football league was founded in 2008, and the country is the only one in the region with a viable league, but it still faces challenges related to funding for teams, with most of its funding coming from FIFA. Grace Nyinawumuntu became the first female referee at the senior level in Rwanda in 2004, and went on to become the first woman to coach a professional team in the country in 2009. Her professional women's side went on to win the league championship under her leadership. The lack of high-level football opportunities in Uganda led to some players going from there to Rwanda for opportunities to play in the country's professional league.

International training related to women is limited in Rwanda. Between 1991 and 2010, there was no FIFA FUTURO III regional course for women's coaching, no women's football seminar held in the country, and no FIFA MA course held for women and youth football. Internationally, in 2007, a representative from the country attended a FIFA sponsored women's football symposium in China. Felicite Rwemarika is the head of women's football in the country. She is credited with developing the sport in the country by founding the Association of Kigali Women in Football amongst other things.

Canceled 2007 participation
The inaugural Council for East and Central Africa Football Associations (CECAFA) Women's Challenge Cup was supposed to be held in Zanzibar in October 2007, an event Rwanda was planning to send a national team to compete in, but the competition was ultimately canceled. The competition was to be funded by Confederation of African Football. The Council of East and Central Africa Football Associations secretary, Nicholas Musonye said of the event, "CAF wants to develop women football in this region in recognition of the milestones CECAFA has achieved over the years. CAF appreciates what CECAFA has done despite the hardships the association has gone through, from financial problems to political instability in member states and poor management of associations. Member states in the CECAFA region have not taken women's football seriously. CAF now wants to sponsor a long-term campaign to attract women from this region into the game."

Home stadium
The Rwanda women's national football team plays their home matches on the Nyamirambo Regional Stadium.

Senior national team
While the Rwanda women's national under-20 football team existed and played in matches by 2009 for the 2010 FIFA U-20 Women's World Cup African qualifiers, the senior national team was not competing in matches during the 2010s. There was no senior team competing in the 2010 African Women's Championships during the preliminary rounds or the 2011 All Africa Games. In March 2012, the team was not ranked in the world by FIFA and a senior national team still did not exist. However, a senior national team played its first official match on 16 February 2014.

She-Amavubi debuted on 16 January 2014, in the 2014 African Women's Championship first qualification round, against Kenya in the Stade Régional Nyamirambo in Kigali. They won 1–0 from a goal scored by Alice Niyoyita at the 29th minute in the first leg. In the second leg in Kenyatta Stadium, Machakos, Kenya they lost 2–1 with the solitary goal scored by Jeanne Nyirahatashima. Rwanda qualified for the second round by the away goals rule after finishing 2–2 on aggregate and played against Nigeria. Their third official match was disputed on 13 May 2014 against Zambia and ended in a 3–0 loss, making it the third loss of their record. They disputed the 2014 African Women's Championship second qualification round with Nigeria on 24 May 2014, losing 4–1. The goal was scored by Clementine Mukamana at the 53rd minute. In the second leg, again competing against Nigeria on 7 June 2014, the She-Amavubi lost by a crushing 8–0 defeat, leaving them out of the 2014 African Women's Championship by a 12–1 aggregate score.

Gloria Nibagwire became the first captain of She-Amavubi.

Rwanda competed at the 2016 CECAFA Women's Championship, losing both games by a 3–2 scoreline, to Tanzania and Ethiopia.

The Rwandan federation hosted the 2018 CECAFA Women's Championship. The Nyamirambo Regional Stadium held all 10 of the games in the round robin tournament. Rwanda beat Tanzania (the eventual champions) 1–0 but finished last on 4 points from their 4 games.

Rwanda's women national football – the 'She-Wasps' eliminated Kenya in the first round of the 2014 African Women's Championship (AWC).

Results and fixtures

The following is a list of match results in the last 12 months, as well as any future matches that have been scheduled.

Legend

2022

2023

Record per opponent
Key

The following table shows Rwanda' all-time official international record per opponent:

Coaching staff

Current coaching staff

Manager history

Players

Current squad
This is the provisional Squad named in May 2022 For 2022 CECAFA Women's Championship  .''
 Caps and goals accurate up to and including 30 October 2021.

Recent call-ups
The following players have been called up to a Rwanda squad in the past 12 months.

  
 

 
 
 
 

INJ Player withdrew from the squad due to an injury.
PRE Preliminary squad.
SUS Player is serving a suspension.
WD Player withdrew for personal reasons.

Previous squads
CECAFA Women's Championship
2022 CECAFA Women's Championship squads

Records

 Active players in bold, statistics correct as of 2020.

Most capped players

Top goalscorers

Competitive record

FIFA Women's World Cup

Olympic Games

Africa Women Cup of Nations

African Games

CECAFA Women's Championship

See also
Football in Rwanda
Sport in Rwanda

References

External links

Official website 
FIFA profile 

 
African women's national association football teams